A pattress or pattress box or fitting box (in the United States and Canada, electrical wall switch box, electrical wall outlet box, electrical ceiling box, switch box, outlet box, electrical box, etc.) is the container for the space behind electrical fittings such as power outlet sockets, light switches, or fixed light fixtures. Pattresses may be designed for either surface mounting (with cabling running along the wall surface) or for embedding in the wall or skirting board. Some electricians use the term "pattress box" to describe a surface-mounted box, although simply the term "pattress" suffices.  The term "flush box" is used for a mounting box that goes inside the wall, although some use the term "wall box". Boxes for installation within timber/plasterboard walls are usually called "cavity boxes" or "plasterboard boxes". A ceiling-mounted pattress (most often used for light fixtures) is referred to as a "ceiling pattress" or "ceiling box". British English speakers also tend to say "pattress box" instead of just "pattress". Pattress is alternatively spelt "patress" and Wiktionary lists both spellings. The word "pattress", despite being attested from the late 19th century, is still rarely found in dictionaries. It is etymologically derived from pateras (Latin for bowls, saucers). The term is not used by electricians in the United States.

Pattresses
Pattresses contain devices for input (switches) and output (sockets and fixtures), with transfer managed by junction boxes. A pattress may be made of metal or plastic. In the United Kingdom, surface-mounted boxes in particular are often made from urea-formaldehyde resin or alternatively PVC and usually white. Wall boxes are commonly made of thin galvanised metal. A pattress box is made to standard dimensions and may contain embedded bushings (in standard positions) for the attachment of wiring devices (switches and sockets). Internal pattress boxes themselves do not include the corresponding faceplates, since the devices to be contained in the box specify the required faceplate. External pattress boxes may offer include corresponding faceplates, limiting the devices to be contained in the box.

Although cables may be joined inside pattress boxes, due simply to their presence at convenient points in the wiring, their main purpose is to accommodate switches and sockets. They allow switches and sockets to be recessed into the wall for a better appearance. Enclosures primarily for joining wires are called junction boxes.

New work boxes
New work boxes are designed to be installed in a new installation. They are typically designed with nail or screw holes to attach directly to wall studs.

Old work boxes
Old work boxes are designed to attach to already-installed wall material (usually drywall). The boxes will almost always have two or more parsellas (from Latin: "small wing or part). The parsellas flip out when the box screws are screwed, securing the box to the wall with the help of the four or more tabs on the front of the box.

Alternative systems 
In some countries, for instance in Germany, wall boxes for electrical fittings generally are not actual rectangular boxes at all but standard-sized round recessed containers. This has the advantage that the corresponding round holes can be simply drilled out with a hole saw rather than needing the cutting-out of a rectangular cavity to accommodate the wall box. Even with those round-hole systems, the faceplates that cover them are mostly rectangular however.

Image gallery

See also

 Wall anchor plates are also known as pattress plates.
 Junction box, an enclosure housing electrical connections
 Electrical wiring in the United Kingdom
 Electrical wiring in North America

References

External links 
 DIY Wiki Pattress page – more information on (British) pattresses and terminology

Cables
Electrical wiring